Jonathan George Caladine Lord (born 17 September 1962) is a British Conservative Party politician who was first elected as the Member of Parliament (MP) for Woking at the 2010 and has since been re-elected at the 2015, 2017 and 2019 general elections. He succeeded Humfrey Malins, his Conservative predecessor who stood down at that election.

Early life 
Born in 1962 of His Honour John Herent Lord, a circuit judge, and (June) Ann Lord (née Caladine), he was educated at Shrewsbury, which included a year scholarship to Kent School in Connecticut. He graduated in 1985 with a BA in History from Merton College, Oxford, and was president of the Oxford University Conservative Association in Michaelmas Term 1983.

Career
While serving on Westminster City Council (1994–2002), he stood unsuccessfully for Parliament in Oldham West and Royton in 1997, becoming deputy leader of Westminster Council between 1998 and 2000. For the 2005 general election, he managed the election campaign for Anne Milton MP, subsequently becoming chair of her local (Guildford) Conservative Association and serving on Surrey County Council between 2009 and 2011.

Lord was selected to fight the Woking seat, during the Conservative Party's 2009 experiment with primary elections. He has a marketing background, having been a director of Saatchi & Saatchi for two years. He is one of 13 vice-presidents of The Debating Group.

Personal life 
He married Caroline Commander in 2000, with whom he has two children: John and Katherine.

References

External links
Official website
Twitter

1962 births
Alumni of Merton College, Oxford
Presidents of the Oxford University Conservative Association
Conservative Party (UK) MPs for English constituencies
Councillors in the City of Westminster
People educated at Shrewsbury School
Kent School alumni
Living people
UK MPs 2010–2015
UK MPs 2015–2017
UK MPs 2017–2019
UK MPs 2019–present
People from Oldham
People from Woking
Members of Surrey County Council
Politicians from Lancashire